Corcelles-Nord railway station is a railway station in the municipality of Corcelles-près-Payerne, in the Swiss canton of Vaud. It is an intermediate stop on the standard gauge Palézieux–Lyss line of Swiss Federal Railways.

Services 
The following services stop at Corcelles-Nord:

References

External links 
 
 

Railway stations in the canton of Vaud
Swiss Federal Railways stations